The 2019 National Pro Fastpitch season was the 16th season of professional softball under the name National Pro Fastpitch (NPF) for the only professional women's softball league in the United States.  From 1997 to 2002, NPF operated under the names Women's Pro Fastpitch (WPF) and Women's Pro Softball League (WPSL). Each year, the playoff teams battle for the Cowles Cup.

Milestones and events
On October 30, 2018, National Pro Fastpitch announced the addition of the expansion team Canadian Wild for the 2019 season, which features members of Canada women's national softball team.

Teams, cities and stadiums

Player acquisition

College draft

The 2019 NPF College Draft was the 16th annual collegiate draft held on April 15, 2019, in Nashville, Tennessee. Pitcher Kelly Barnhill of Florida was selected first overall by the Chicago Bandits.

League standings 

Updated as of the results of all games through August 11, 2019.

Results table

Game log

Players of the Week

NPF Championship

Championship Game

Annual awards

All-NPF Team

References

External links 
 

Softball teams
Softball in the United States
National Pro Fastpitch season
National Pro Fastpitch season